Madhupur National Park is a major and one of the earliest national park in Bangladesh.

Description
The Forest was established as a national park by the Bangladesh government in 1962 but, was officially declared as National park in 1982 under the Bangladesh wildlife (Preservation) Amendment Act of 1947. The park is located at Madhupur Upazila, Tangail District in the North region of the country. The local topography  mainly consists of  flat topped ridges (Chalas) intersected by numerous depressions (Baids).

Climate
The climate is generally moderate. The temperature rises up to 37 °C in May and drops down to minimum 10 °C in January. The park enjoys tropical Monsoon from June to September every year. The soil is loamy, clay and sandy loam at various places.

Biodiversity

Flora
The general walk in the forest is easy due to the flat terrain. About 40% of the forest area is covered with Sal (Shorea robusta) trees. Madhupur forests are considered one of the best sal forest in entire Bangladesh. The sal trees grow in association with Dillenia pentagyna, Lagerstroemia parviflora, Adina cordifolia, Miliusa velutina, Lannea grandis, Albizia spp., Bauhinia variegata, Spondias mangifera, Butea frondosa and Barringtonia acutangula. The undergrowth is shrubby, which includes Eupatoriun odoratum, Pennisetum setosum,  Asparagus racemosus and Rauvolfia serpentina. Plantations of Teak Tectona grandis, Cassia siamea, Morus spp., Terminalia arjuna and Syzygium cumini were made in the park area. 176 plant species were identified in the park, which include 73 tree species, 22 shrub species, 27 climbers, 45 medicinal plants, 8 grasses and 1 palm species.

Fauna
Since long back, Madhupur forest was rich in wildlife and was famous for tigers. The fauna consists of 190 species which include 21 mammals, 140 birds, and 29 snakes.

Human settlement
There is large human habitation inside and along the National park area. Some 4500 Garo tribals were allowed for the settlement inside the park in 1968.in 1989 the human population was about 14,000. Mainly paddy  is cultivated in plains and pineapple and cassava is cultivated as a commercial crop on higher lands.

See also

 List of protected areas of Bangladesh

References

National parks of Bangladesh
Forests of Bangladesh
Lower Gangetic Plains moist deciduous forests